Walker's Inn is a historic building in rural Cherokee County, North Carolina.  It is located at the northeast corner of the junction of SR 1505 and SR 1383 near Andrews.  The house, appearing as a two-story five-bay frame house, was apparently built in stages, beginning c. 1844, after William Walker acquired the land on which it stands.  The three rightmost bays of the house are a log structure, while the two on the left are a frame structure.  The logs are partially exposed on the front, while most of the house is sheathed in board-and-batten siding.  Windows are irregularly placed on the main facade.  Long known as an inn, it sits along what was in the 19th century the major route between Franklin and Murphy.  Frederick Law Olmsted stayed at the inn during his travels in the area in the late 19th century.

The building was listed on the National Register of Historic Places in 1975.

See also
National Register of Historic Places listings in Cherokee County, North Carolina

References

Houses on the National Register of Historic Places in North Carolina
Houses completed in 1844
Houses in Cherokee County, North Carolina
National Register of Historic Places in Cherokee County, North Carolina